Church of the Incarnation may refer to:

 Church of the Incarnation (Dallas, Texas)
 Church of the Incarnation (Amite, Louisiana)
 Church of the Incarnation, Episcopal (Manhattan)
 Church of the Incarnation, Roman Catholic (Manhattan)
 Church of the Incarnation (Highlands, North Carolina)